Reagan Dunk (born February 8, 1994) is an American soccer player.

Career

College and amateur
Dunk was an all-American college soccer at the University of Denver between 2012 and 2016, but sat out 2012 as a redshirt.

Professional
Dunk was drafted in the first round (13th overall) of the 2017 MLS SuperDraft by Real Salt Lake. Dunk signed with Salt Lake on February 28, 2017.

References

External links
 

1994 births
Living people
All-American men's college soccer players
American soccer players
Association football defenders
Denver Pioneers men's soccer players
Major League Soccer players
Real Monarchs players
Real Salt Lake draft picks
Real Salt Lake players
Soccer players from Dallas
USL Championship players